Homaloxestis tenuipalpella is a moth in the family Lecithoceridae. It was described by Snellen in 1903. It is found on Java.

The wingspan is 11–14 mm. The forewings are brownish-grey. The hindwings are somewhat darker.

References

Moths described in 1903
Homaloxestis